This is a list of cities and towns in Saint Kitts and Nevis. For convenience, the list is organized by parishes, which are the administrative units of the Federation of Saint Kitts and Nevis. Note that the majority of these settlements, especially on Nevis, are small and would usually be considered to be villages rather than towns.

Parishes

Notes and References 

ORDNANCE SURVEY, GOVERNMENT OF THE UNITED KINGDOM, 1984, Nevis, with part of St. Christopher (Saint Kitts). Series E803 (D.O.S. 343), Sheet NEVIS, Edition 5 O.S.D. 1984. Reprinted in 1995, published by the Government of the United Kingdom (Ordnance Survey) for the Government of Saint Christopher (St. Kitts) and Nevis.

Cities and Towns

Saint Kitts and Nevis, List of cities in
 
Cities